This is a list of schools in the city of Newport South Wales.

Primary schools

Alway Primary School 
Brynglas Primary School 
Charles Williams Church in Wales Primary School, Caerleon
Lodge Hill Primary School, Caerleon
Clytha Primary School 
Crindau Primary School 
Don Close Nursery School 
Duffryn Infants School 
Duffryn Junior School 
Eveswell Primary School 
Fairoak Nursery School 
Gaer Infants School 
Gaer Junior School 
Glan Usk Primary School 
Glasllwch Primary School 
High Cross Primary School 
Kimberley Nursery School 
Langstone Primary School 
Llanmartin Primary School 
Lliswerry Infants School 
Lliswerry Junior School 
Maesglas Primary School 
Maindee Primary School 
Malpas Church Primary School 
Malpas Court Primary School 
Malpas Park Primary School 
Marshfield Primary School 
Millbrook Primary School 
Milton Infants School 
Milton Junior School 
Monnow Primary School 
Mount Pleasant Primary School 
Pentrepoeth Primary School  
Pillgwenlly Primary School
Ringland Primary School 
Rockfield Nursery School 
Rogerstone Primary School 
Somerton Primary School 
St Andrew's Infants School 
St Andrew's Junior School 
St David's Primary School 
St Gabriel's RC Primary School 
St Joseph's RC Primary School 
St Julian's Infants School 
St Julian's Junior School 
St Mary's RC Primary School 
St Michael's RC Primary School 
St Patrick's RC Primary School 
St Woolos Primary School 
Ysgol Gymraeg Bro Teyrnon  ð
Ysgol Gymraeg Casnewydd  ð
Ysgol Gymraeg Ifor Hael  ð

ð symbol indicates schools delivering Welsh-medium education

State secondary schools
Bassaleg School
Caerleon Comprehensive School
Duffryn High School
Lliswerry High School
Llanwern High School
Newport High School
St Joseph's RC High School
St Julian's School
Ysgol Gyfun Gwent Is Coed, delivering a Welsh-medium education

Special schools
Maes Ebbw School

Independent schools
Rougemont School

References

 
Newport